Crivellaro is a surname. Notable people with the surname include:

Enrico Crivellaro (born 1989), Italian blues musician
Lucas Piton Crivellaro (born 2000), Brazilian footballer
Rafael Crivellaro (born 1989), Brazilian footballer

Italian-language surnames